Agrotis porphyricollis (variable cutworm) is a noctuid moth. It is found in Tasmania, Victoria and New South Wales.

The wingspan is about 30 mm.

The larvae stay underground during daytime and emerge at night to feed. They are considered a pest on Beta vulgaris and Solanum tuberosum.

External links
Herbison-Evans, Don; Crossley, Stella (2006) Agrotis porphyricollis

Agrotis
Agricultural pest insects
Moths of Australia
Moths described in 1852